Batiuk is a surname. Notable people with the surname include:

 Tom Batiuk (born 1947), American comic artist
 Victor Batiuk (1939–1996), Ukrainian diplomat and poet
 John Batiuk (1923–2005), Canadian politician